Google Maps Navigation is a mobile application developed by Google for the Android and iOS operating systems that was later integrated into the Google Maps mobile app. The application uses an Internet connection to a GPS navigation system to provide turn-by-turn voice-guided instructions on how to arrive at a given destination.
The application requires connection to Internet data (e.g. 3G, 4G, 5G, WiFi, etc.) and normally uses a GPS satellite connection to determine its location. A user can enter a destination into the application, which will plot a path to it. The app displays the user's progress along the route and issues instructions for each turn.

History
The application’s beta release was released on October 28, 2009, accompanying the release of Android 2.0 (Eclair) on the Motorola Milestone (known as the Motorola Droid). Google Maps Navigation Beta was initially released in the United States. The application (version 4.2) was later released in the UK on April 20, 2010 and Austria, Belgium, Canada, Denmark, France, Germany, Italy, the Netherlands, Portugal, Spain, and Switzerland on June 9, 2010.

Features

Search 
Instead of searching for an address or a street name, the application can also search by name, for example guide the user to a nearby restaurant by being given the name of the restaurant.  The application can also take phrases such as “a place with burgers” and suggest nearby destinations that match the phrase. The application can receive a voice input instead of typing the destination on the device.

Multiple views

 Traffic: The application's traffic congestion map shows the route marks with different colours based on the current traffic along the route. The traffic is measured by data from local road services such as highway cameras, as well as speed and location information from other Android devices that are accessing Google Maps for Mobile.
 Satellite: The application displays a route from a bird’s eye view using Google’s satellite imagery.
 Street: The Google Street View feature displays a route from first-person view as which automatically changes as the user travels along the route....

Car dock mode
Users can dock their Android device in a car using a special car dock for the device (which may or may not come with the device). Once docked, the device will enter this mode, enabling for easier access to the navigation features at an arm’s length.

Walking and transit
The application provides voice navigation for walking and previously for transit directions. In its current iteration navigation is not available for transit, only a list of directions is provided. The transit directions are available in 400 cities around the world.

Offline guidance
Once the user has searched for a destination, the map will cache along the intended route. It is also possible to download a map over a certain area and store it on the phone, which can be useful when there are high roaming charges or expected slow connection. The application requires an Internet connection to search for the route uneless an offline map is downloaded, but once a route has been found the user no longer requires an Internet connection as the route is temporarily saved onto the device, unless an offline map has been downloaded to the device's local storage.

Availability 
The application is available in the following regions, as of 27 November 2014:

 Algeria
 Andorra
 Angola
 Argentina
 Armenia
 Australia
 Austria
 Bahamas
 Bahrain
 Bangladesh
 Belgium
 Bolivia
 Botswana
 Brazil
 Bulgaria
 Cameroon
 Canada
 Costa Rica
 Croatia
 Czech Republic
 Denmark
 Dominican Republic
 Ecuador
 Egypt
 El Salvador
 Estonia
 Ethiopia
 Fiji
 Finland
 France
 Germany
 Ghana
 Greece
 Guatemala
 Guyana
 Honduras
 Hong Kong (China)
 Hungary
 Iceland
 India
 Indonesia
 Ireland
 Israel
 Italy
 Côte d'Ivoire
 Jamaica
 Japan
 Jordan
 Kenya
 Kuwait
 Latvia
 Lebanon
 Libya
 Lithuania
 Luxembourg
 Madagascar
 Malawi
 Malaysia
 Mali
 Malta
 Mauritius
 Mexico
 Mozambique
 Namibia
 Nepal
 Netherlands
 New Zealand
 Nicaragua
 Nigeria
 Norway
 Oman
 Pakistan
 Panama
 Paraguay
 Peru
 Philippines
 Poland
 Portugal
 Puerto Rico
 Qatar
 Romania
 Russia
 Rwanda
 Saudi Arabia
 Senegal
 Serbia
 Singapore
 Slovakia
 Slovenia
 South Africa
 Spain
 Sri Lanka
 Sweden
 Switzerland
 Taiwan
 Tanzania
 Thailand
 Trinidad and Tobago
 Tunisia
 Turkey
 Uganda
 Ukraine
 United Arab Emirates
 United Kingdom
 United States
 Uruguay
 Venezuela

See also 
Comparison of satellite navigation software

References

Navigation
Android (operating system) software
Maps Navigation